Buchananella hordeovulneris is a species of bacteria from the family Actinomycetaceae.

References

Actinomycetales
Monotypic bacteria genera
Bacteria described in 1984